The Committee on the Internal Market and Consumer Protection (IMCO) is a committee of the European Parliament.

Work of the committee 
The committee  is responsible for:
 coordination at Community level of national legislation in the sphere of the internal market and of the customs union, in particular:
 the free movement of goods including the harmonization of technical standards
 the right of establishment
 the freedom to provide services (other than in the financial and postal sectors)
 measures aiming at the identification and removal of potential obstacles to the functioning of the internal market;
 the promotion and protection of the economic interests of consumers (other than public health and food safety issues) in the context of the establishment of the internal market.

8th European Parliament (2014–19)

The committee chair, elected in June 2017, is Anneleen Van Bossuyt (ECR, Belgium). She replaces Vicky Ford (ECR, UK), who resigned after being elected national MP in the 2017 UK election.

Vice-Chairs are Anna Maria Corazza Bildt (EPP, Sweden), Robert Rochefort (ALDE, France) and Nicola Danti (S&D, Italy).

Russian invasion of Ukraine
IMCO members have noted that the Russian invasion of Ukraine has had a notable impact on the European Union's single or internal market and are continuing to monitor the situation.

References

External links
Official Webpage

Internal